William George David Sykes (1939 – 17 January 2015) was an English college fellow, Anglican priest, and book author.

Biography
Bill Sykes was born in Yorkshire, England. He attended school at Worksop College in Worksop, Nottinghamshire. Sykes then undertook National Service, joining the Gurkhas. He then studied for a PPE degree at Balliol College, Oxford. Upon finishing his degree and following on from his experience with the Gurkhas, Sykes joined an expedition to Nepal organized by Oxford University, acting as an interpreter. After returning from the expedition, Sykes trained for ordination at Wycliffe Hall in North Oxford.

In 1965, Sykes was appointed as a canon at Bradford Cathedral in Yorkshire. In 1969, he became the chaplain at University College London. In 1978, he moved to University College, Oxford as fellow and chaplain, remaining there until his retirement in 2005. Subsequently, he was elected as an Emeritus Fellow of the College.

Sykes wrote books and reflective thoughts on religious ideas, most notably Visions of Faith: An Anthology of Reflections. His portrait was painted by the artist Daphne Todd.

Bill Sykes died on 17 January 2015 at the John Radcliffe Hospital in Oxford, England, aged 75.

References

External links
 Bill Sykes audio recording on AudioBoom
 Tributes to Bill Sykes, University College, Oxford

1939 births
2015 deaths
Clergy from Yorkshire
People educated at Worksop College
Royal Gurkha Rifles officers
Alumni of Balliol College, Oxford
Alumni of Wycliffe Hall, Oxford
20th-century English Anglican priests
University and college chaplains in the United Kingdom
Academics of University College London
Fellows of University College, Oxford
Chaplains of University College, Oxford
Anglican writers